Ethan Allen (June 18, 1849 – September 10, 1876) was an influential Morgan horse sire and trotting racehorse.

Life
Ethan Allen was foaled June 18, 1849. He was sired by Black Hawk and out of an unnamed gray mare who was herself sired by Red Robin, a son of Figure. Ethan Allen was bred by Joel W. Holcomb of Ticonderoga, New York.
Ethan Allen was a bay with three white socks and a white star on his forehead.
Ethan Allen was the champion trotter of his time; he trotted the mile in 2:25. He was owned by multiple owners, and during 1866 and 1868 he stood at stud in Boston for a fee of $100. He sired approximately 72 foals in his lifetime, of which only two were fillies. He was featured in several Currier and Ives prints and was the model for a popular trotting horse weathervane. 
Ethan Allen died in Lawrence, Kansas on September 10, 1876 at the age of 28, and was buried there with a marker over his grave. Later, he was exhumed and his articulated skeleton was put on display in the museum there.

References

Further reading
Last Message of Ethan Allen (a poem)

1849 racehorse births
1876 racehorse deaths
Individual Morgan horses
United States Harness Racing Hall of Fame inductees